Kottakulam is a panchayat town in Tirunelveli district in the Indian state of Tamil Nadu. Kottakulam is aka Sumaitheernthapuram.

Geography
It is located next to Ilanji. It is under by vallam VAO office and Shenkottah Taluk. It is located 4 km away from the main town Tenkasi and also 3 km from the most beautiful Coutrallam falls. Kollam to Madurai National Highway 208 travels across this village. It is also bounded by two lake, West Kottakulam lake (Tamil : மேலக்குளம்) and East Kottakulam Lake and Kundar (Tamil : கீழக்குளம்), and by a river, Kundaru (Tamil : குண்டாறு) (Vadakkaru).

Demographics 
 India census, Kottakulam had a population of 3600. Males constitute 51% of the population and females 49%.

References

Cities and towns in Tirunelveli district